Traffic is a 2000 American crime drama film directed by Steven Soderbergh and written by Stephen Gaghan. It explores the illegal drug trade from a number of perspectives: users, enforcers, politicians, and traffickers. Their stories are edited together throughout the film, although some of the characters do not meet each other. The film is an adaptation of the 1989 British Channel 4 television series Traffik. The film stars an international ensemble cast, including Don Cheadle, Benicio del Toro, Michael Douglas, Erika Christensen, Luis Guzmán, Dennis Quaid, Catherine Zeta-Jones, Jacob Vargas, Tomas Milian, Topher Grace, James Brolin, Steven Bauer, and Benjamin Bratt. It features both English and Spanish-language dialogue.

20th Century Fox, the original financiers of the film, demanded that Harrison Ford play a leading role and that significant changes to the screenplay be made. Soderbergh refused and proposed the script to other major Hollywood studios, but it was rejected because of the three-hour running time and the subject matter—Traffic is more of a political film than most Hollywood productions. USA Films, however, liked the project from the start and offered the filmmakers more money than Fox. Soderbergh operated the camera himself and adopted a distinctive color grade for each storyline so that audiences could tell them apart.

Traffic was released in the United States on December 27, 2000 and received critical acclaim for Soderbergh's direction, the film's style, complexity, messages, and the performances of the cast (particularly del Toro's). Traffic earned numerous awards, including four Oscars: Best Director for Steven Soderbergh, Best Supporting Actor for Benicio del Toro, Best Adapted Screenplay for Stephen Gaghan and Best Film Editing for Stephen Mirrione. It was also a commercial success with a worldwide box-office revenue total of $207.5 million, well above its estimated $46 million budget.

In 2004, USA Network ran a miniseries—also called Traffic—based on the film and the 1989 British television series.

Plot

Mexico storyline
In Mexico, police officer Javier Rodriguez and his partner Manolo Sanchez stop a drug transport and arrest the couriers. Their arrest is interrupted by General Salazar, a high-ranking Mexican official who decides to hire Javier. Salazar instructs him to apprehend Francisco Flores, a hitman for the Tijuana Cartel, headed by the Obregón brothers. Salazar expresses that he wishes to shut down the Obregón cartel and that Flores will be the first step in doing so.

Back in Tijuana, Flores, under torture, gives Salazar the names of important members of the Obregón cartel, who are soon arrested. Javier's and Salazar's efforts begin to cripple the Obregón brothers' cocaine outfit, but Javier soon discovers the truth. While transporting a woman under Salazar's orders, Javier and Manolo discover the house they arrive at is the home of Porfirio Madrigal, "The Scorpion"; the drug lord of the Juárez Cartel.

The two officers deduce that Salazar is a pawn for the Juárez Cartel, and that the Mexican anti-drug campaign is a fraud. Salazar has been wiping out the Obregón cartel for profit, secretly being aligned with Madrigal and his Juárez operation. Manolo attempts to sell the information of Salazar's true affiliation to the Drug Enforcement Administration (DEA) but Salazar discovers his plot and has him murdered in the desert with Javier being forced to watch. No longer able to handle working for Salazar, Javier arranges a deal with the DEA. Javier expresses grief for turning against his government, but agrees to exchange his testimony for electricity in his neighborhood. If the neighborhood has electricity then the children will be able to play baseball at night where it's safe, instead of being lured into the toxic underworld of drugs and crime. Eventually, all of Salazar's secrets are revealed and he is placed under arrest. Soon after Salazar is shown dying in the same prison where Flores was tortured.

As the film ends, Javier is later shown sitting among other people on some bleachers at night. The people watch as young children laugh and play with one another during a game of baseball, none the wiser to the dark events of the drug world beyond them. Javier looks on knowing that, for a moment, the cycle of crime and pain has been stopped.

Wakefield storyline
Robert Wakefield, a conservative Ohio judge, is appointed to head the President's Office of National Drug Control Policy, taking on the title drug czar. Robert is warned by his predecessor and several influential politicians that the War on Drugs is unwinnable. Robert's teenage daughter, Caroline, a highly accomplished honors student, has been using cocaine, methamphetamine, and soon begins using heroin. Almost immediately, Caroline becomes addicted after her boyfriend Seth introduces her to freebasing. One night after a fellow student overdoses on cocaine, Caroline and her friends are arrested while trying to anonymously dump the student in front of the hospital. As Robert and his wife Barbara struggle to deal with the problem, Robert discovers that Barbara has known about their daughter's drug use for over six months. One night after an argument with his wife, Robert catches Caroline freebasing in the bathroom, completely high. Furious, Robert sends her to rehab before setting off to meet with General Salazar in Mexico City.

On a visit to Mexico, he is encouraged by Salazar's successful efforts in stifling the Obregón brothers cartel. Feeling the strain from his daughter's situation, Robert asks Salazar how the Mexican government is handling treatment of addiction. Robert is forced to hide his panic, when Salazar coldly replies that addicts "treat themselves" by overdosing. During this time, Caroline has managed to escape from her rehab facility and has run away.

She returns to Cincinnati to procure more drugs and ends up sleeping with Seth's drug dealer, high, as payment. By this time, Robert has learned that General Salazar has been arrested and has in fact been working against the anti-drug campaign. Then after finding that Caroline has stolen jewelry and money, Robert sets out desperately to find her himself. He drags Seth out of school and the two head for the drug dealer's location. Upon arrival, the dealer angrily refuses to give any information on Caroline and orders the two to leave at gunpoint. Later, Robert follows Seth to a seedy hotel the two had used before, and finds a semi-conscious Caroline about to be prostituted to an older man. Finding her alive, Robert breaks down in tears as Seth quietly leaves. Upon returning to Washington, D.C., Robert prepares to give his speech on a "10-point plan" to win the war on drugs. But when he cites drug addicts as the "enemy," he falters upon realizing the tragedy of his own situation. He states that the War on Drugs implies a war even on some people's own family members, which he can no longer endorse, and walks out of the press conference to return to his family.

Robert and Barbara go to a Narcotics Anonymous meeting with their daughter, where she remarks on the progress she's made. Robert responds with support for his daughter, and their full intention to "listen" moving forward.

Ayala/DEA storyline
In San Diego, an undercover DEA investigation is led by Montel Gordon and Ray Castro following a tip from an anonymous source. This leads to the arrest of Eduardo Ruiz, a high-stakes dealer posing as a storage-locker business owner. After some initial pressure, Ruiz decides to take the dangerous road to immunity by giving up his boss: drug lord Carl Ayala, the biggest distributor for the Obregón brothers in the United States. Ayala is indicted by a prosecutor chosen by Robert Wakefield, intending to send a message to the Mexican drug cartels.

As the trial against Ayala begins, his pregnant wife Helena learns of her husband's true profession from his associate, Arnie Metzger. Facing the prospect of life imprisonment for her husband and death threats against her child, Helena decides to step into Carl's underworld and looks into some of his contacts. She then hires Francisco Flores to assassinate Eduardo Ruiz; knowing that killing Ruiz will effectively end the trial nolle prosequi. Flores plants a car bomb on a DEA car in an assassination, but Ruiz tells the agents he wants to walk to the hotel instead of taking the car; Helena orders Flores to shoot Ruiz on the sidewalk. As he goes to pull the trigger, Flores is shot by a cartel sniper for his cooperation with Javier and General Salazar, while the DEA guns him down in the confusion. Amidst the chaos Agent Castro runs to retrieve the car and is killed instantly, but leaving Gordon and Ruiz unharmed.

Helena, knowing Ruiz will soon testify, meets with the drug lord Juan Obregón, head of the Obregón cartel. While they negotiate, Obregón speculates Ruiz and Ayala's downfall is due to a leak within their own organization. After a tense exchange, Helena and Obregón come to an agreement. In exchange for an undetectable and state-of-the-art cocaine distribution, the Ayala family will become the sole distributor of Obregón cocaine, will have their debt forgiven, and Eduardo Ruiz will be killed. On the day of his testimony, Ruiz is murdered after an Obregón associate poisons his breakfast disguised as a bellboy. Ruiz dies in agony with Gordon helpless, effectively ending the trial and setting Ayala free. During a phone conversation between Ayala and Metzger, Ayala deduces that it was Metzger who originally informed on Ruiz. Evidently in a bid for power with the Juárez cartel in Mexico, Metzger accepted $3 million to inform on Ruiz to the FBI and facilitate the Ayala and Obregón organization's downfall. As Ayala hangs up the phone, Metzger looks up to see two hitmen entering his office. Suddenly, Gordon bursts into the Ayala home during his homecoming celebration. Bodyguards wrestle him to the ground, but Gordon is able to surreptitiously plant a listening bug under Ayala's desk. Gordon is forced from the property, smiling to himself, knowing that there is now a new opportunity to trap Ayala and Helena.

Relationship to actual events
Some aspects of the plotline are based on actual people and events:
 The character General Arturo Salazar is closely modeled after Mexican General Jesús Gutiérrez Rebollo, who was secretly on the payroll of Amado Carrillo Fuentes, head of the Juarez Cartel.
 The character Porfirio Madrigal is modeled after Fuentes.
 The Obregón brothers are modeled after the Tijuana Cartel's Arellano Félix brothers.

At one point in the film, an El Paso Intelligence Center agent tells Robert his position, official in charge of drug control, doesn't exist in Mexico. As noted in the original script, a Director of the Instituto Nacional para el Combate a las Drogas was created by the Attorney General of Mexico in 1996.

Cast
 Benicio del Toro as Javier Rodriguez Rodríguez, officer of the Mexican police and police partner of Manolo Sanchez
 Jacob Vargas as Manolo Sanchez, officer of the Mexican police and police partner of Javier Rodriguez
 Marisol Padilla Sánchez as Ana Sanchez, Manolo's wife
 Tomas Milian as General Arturo Salazar, a corrupt general of the Mexican Army who has ties with Porfirio Madrigal, head of the powerful Juarez Cartel
 Michael Douglas as Robert Wakefield, a powerful judge from Ohio and Caroline's father
 Amy Irving as Barbara Wakefield, Robert Wakefield's wife
 Erika Christensen as Caroline Wakefield, Robert Wakefield's daughter and an endangered drug user
 Topher Grace as Seth Abrahams, Caroline's drug using boyfriend
 D. W. Moffett as Jeff Sheridan
 James Brolin as General Ralph Landry, Robert's predecessor
 Albert Finney as White House Chief of Staff
 Steven Bauer as Carlos Ayala, a notorious and powerful drug lord from Mexico
 Catherine Zeta-Jones as Helena Ayala, Carlos Ayala's pregnant wife
 Dennis Quaid as Arnie Metzger, Carlos Ayala's crime partner
 Clifton Collins, Jr. as Francisco "Frankie Flowers" Flores, a sicario who works for the Obregón brothers, the heads of the powerful Tijuana Cartel
 Don Cheadle as Montel Gordon, DEA agent and Ray's fellow undercover partner
 Luis Guzmán as Ray Castro, DEA agent and Montel's fellow undercover partner
 Miguel Ferrer as Eduardo Ruiz, a drug dealer who works for Carlos Ayala
 Peter Riegert as Michael Adler
 Benjamin Bratt as Juan Obregón, a powerful Mexican drug lord, one of the Obregón brothers and the head of Tijuana Cartel
 Viola Davis as the Social Worker
 John Slattery as Assistant District Attorney Dan Colier
 James Pickens Jr. as The Prosecutor
 Salma Hayek as Rosario (uncredited)

Development
Steven Soderbergh had been interested in making a film about the drug wars for some time but did not want to make one about addicts. Producer Laura Bickford obtained the rights to the British teleivison miniseries Traffik (1989) and liked its structure. Soderbergh, who had seen the miniseries in 1990, started looking for a screenwriter to adapt it into a film. They read a script by Stephen Gaghan called Havoc, about upper-class white kids in Palisades High School doing drugs and getting involved with gangs. Soderbergh approached Gaghan to work on his film, but found he was already working for producer/director Edward Zwick. Bickford and Soderbergh approached Zwick, who agreed to merge the two projects and come aboard as a producer.

Traffic was originally going to be distributed by 20th Century Fox, but it was put into turnaround unless actor Harrison Ford agreed to star. Soderbergh began shopping the film to other studios, but when Ford suddenly showed interest in Traffic, Fox's interest in the film was renewed, and the studio took it out of turnaround. Fox CEO Bill Mechanic championed the film, but he departed from the studio by the time the first draft was finished. It went back into turnaround. Mechanic had also wanted to make some changes to the script, but Soderbergh disagreed and decided to shop the film to other major studios. They all turned him down because they were not confident in the prospects of a three-hour film about drugs, according to Gaghan. USA Films, however, had wanted to take on the movie from the first time Soderbergh approached them. They provided the filmmakers with a $46 million budget, a considerable increase from the $25 million which Fox offered.

Screenplay
Soderbergh had "conceptual discussions" with Gaghan while he was shooting The Limey in October 1998, and they finished the outline before he went off to shoot Erin Brockovich. After Soderbergh was finished with that film, Gaghan had written a first draft in six weeks that was 165 pages long. After the film was approved for production, Soderbergh and Gaghan met two separate times for three days to reformat the script. The draft they shot with had 163 pages with 135 speaking parts and featured seven cities. The film shortens the storyline of the original mini-series; a major character arc, that of a farmer, is taken out, and the Pakistani plotline is replaced with one set in Mexico.

Casting
Harrison Ford was initially considered for the role of Robert Wakefield in January 2000 but would have had to take a significant cut in his usual $20 million salary. Ford met with Soderbergh to flesh out the character. Gaghan agreed to rework the role, adding several scenes that ended up in the finished film. On February 20, Ford turned down the role, and the filmmakers brought it back to Michael Douglas, who had turned down an earlier draft. He liked the changes made and agreed to star, which helped greenlight the project. Gaghan believes Ford turned down the role because he wanted to "reconnect with his action fans".

The filmmakers sent out letters to many politicians, both Democrat and Republican, asking them to make cameo appearances in the film. Several of the scenes had already been shot using actors in these roles, but the filmmakers went back and re-shot those scenes when real politicians agreed to be in the film. Those who agreed, including U.S. Senators Harry Reid, Barbara Boxer, Orrin Hatch, Charles Grassley, and Don Nickles, and Massachusetts governor Bill Weld, were filmed in a scene that was entirely improvised.

Pre-production
The project was obtained from Fox by Initial Entertainment Group, and was sold to USA Films by IEG for North American rights only. Steven Soderbergh never approached USA Films, and the film was fully funded by Initial Entertainment Group.

After Fox dropped the film in early 2000 and before USA Films expressed interest soon after, Soderbergh paid for pre-production with his own money. USA Films agreed to give him final cut on Traffic and also agreed to his term that all the Mexican characters would speak Spanish while talking to each other. This meant that almost all of Benicio del Toro's dialogue would be subtitled. Once the studio realized this, they suggested that his scenes be shot in both English and Spanish, but Soderbergh and del Toro rejected the suggestion. Del Toro, a native of Puerto Rico, was worried that another actor would be brought in and re-record his dialogue in English after he had worked hard to master Mexican inflections and improve his Spanish vocabulary. Del Toro remembers, "Can you imagine? You do the whole movie, bust your butt to get it as realistic as possible, and someone dubs your voice? I said, 'No way. Over my dead body.' Steven was like, 'Don't worry. It's not gonna happen.'" The director fought for subtitles for the Mexico scenes, arguing that if the characters did not speak Spanish, the film would have no integrity and would not convincingly portray what he described as the "impenetrability of another culture".

The filmmakers went to the Drug Enforcement Administration (DEA) and U.S. Customs early on with the script and told them that they were trying to present as detailed and accurate a picture of the current drug war as possible. The DEA and Customs pointed out inaccuracies in the script. In addition, they gave the production team access to the border checkpoint to Mexico, as shown in the film during the scene in which Wakefield and his people talk with border officials. Despite the assistance, the DEA did not try to influence the content of the script. Soderbergh said Traffic had influences from the films of Richard Lester and Jean-Luc Godard. He also spent time analyzing The Battle of Algiers and Z, which, according to the director, had the feeling that the footage was "caught" and not staged. Another inspiration was Alan J. Pakula's film All the President's Men because of its ability to tackle serious issues while being entertaining. In the opening credits of his film, Soderbergh tried to replicate the typeface from All the President's Men and the placement on-screen at the bottom left-hand corner. Analyzing this film helped the director deal with the large cast and working in many different locations for Traffic.

Principal photography
Half of the first day's footage came out overexposed and unusable. Before the financiers or studio bosses knew about the problem, Soderbergh was already doing reshoots. The insurers made him agree that any further mishaps resulting in additional filming would come out of the director's own pocket. Soderbergh shot in various cities in California, Ohio and Texas, on a 54-day schedule and came in $2 million under budget. The director acted as his own cinematographer under the pseudonym Peter Andrews and operated the camera himself in an effort to "get as close to the movie as I can," and to eliminate the distance between the actors and himself. Soderbergh drew inspiration from the cinema verite style of Ken Loach's films, studying the framing of scenes, the distance of the camera to the actors, lens length, and the tightness of eyelines depending on the position of a character. Soderbergh remembers, "I noticed that there's a space that's inviolate, that if you get within something, you cross the edge into a more theatrical aesthetic as opposed to a documentary aesthetic". Most of the day was spent shooting because a lot of the film was shot with available light.

For the hand-held camera footage, Soderbergh used Panavision Millennium XLs that were smaller and lighter than previous cameras and allowed him to move freely. In order to tell the three stories apart, he adopted a distinctive look for each. For Robert Wakefield's story, Soderbergh used tungsten film with no filter for a cold, monochrome blue feel. For Helena Ayala's story, Soderbergh used diffusion filters, flashing the film, overexposing it for a warmer feel. For Javier Rodriguez's story, the director used tobacco filters and a 45-degree shutter angle whenever possible to produce a strobe-like sharp feel. Then, he took the entire film through an Ektachrome step, which increased the contrast and grain significantly. He wanted to have different looks for each story because the audience had to keep track of many characters and absorb a lot of information and he did not want them to have to figure out which story they were watching.

Benicio del Toro had significant input into certain parts of the film; for example, he suggested a simpler, more concise way of depicting his character kidnapping Francisco Flores that Soderbergh ended up using. The director cut a scene in which Robert Wakefield smokes crack after finding it in his daughter's bedroom. After rehearsing this scene with the actors, he felt that the character would not do it; after consulting with Gaghan, the screenwriter agreed and the filmmakers cut the scene shortly before it was scheduled to be shot.

Balboa Park, Downtown San Diego and La Jolla were utilized as the environment for the film.

Post-production
The first cut of Traffic ran three hours and ten minutes. Soderbergh cut it down to two hours and twenty minutes. Early on, there were concerns that the film might get an NC-17 rating and he was prepared to release it with that rating, but the MPAA gave it an R.

Release

Box office performance
Traffic was given a limited release on December 27, 2000, in four theaters where it grossed  on its opening weekend. It was given a wide release on January 5, 2001, in 1,510 theaters, grossing $15.5 million on its opening weekend. The film made $124.1 million in North America and $83.4 million in foreign markets for a worldwide total of $207.5 million, well above its estimated $46 million budget.

Home media
In the United States the film was released on DVD on May 28, 2002 by The Criterion Collection. In Australia, Traffic was released on DVD by Village Roadshow, with an MA15+ rating. Despite the Australian packaging stating the length to be 124 minutes in length, the actual version on the DVD is just over 141 minutes in length.

Critical response
On Rotten Tomatoes, the film holds an approval rating of 92% based on 163 reviews, with an average rating of 8/10. The site's critical consensus reads, "Soderbergh successfully pulls off the highly ambitious Traffic, a movie with three different stories and a very large cast. The issues of ethics are gray rather than black-and-white, with no clear-cut good guys. Terrific acting all around." On Metacritic the film has received an average score of 86 out of 100, based on 34 critics, indicating "universal acclaim". Audiences polled by CinemaScore gave the film an average grade of "B" on an A+ to F scale.

Film critic Roger Ebert gave the film four out of four stars and wrote, "The movie is powerful precisely because it doesn't preach. It is so restrained that at one moment—the judge's final speech—I wanted one more sentence, making a point, but the movie lets us supply that thought for ourselves". Stephen Holden, in his review for The New York Times, wrote, "Traffic is an utterly gripping, edge-of-your-seat thriller. Or rather it is several interwoven thrillers, each with its own tense rhythm and explosive payoff". In his review for The New York Observer, Andrew Sarris wrote, "Traffic marks [Soderbergh] definitively as an enormous talent, one who never lets us guess what he's going to do next. The promise of Sex, Lies, and Videotape has been fulfilled".

Entertainment Weekly gave the film an "A" rating and praised Benicio del Toro's performance, which critic Owen Gleiberman called, "haunting in his understatement, [it] becomes the film's quietly awakening moral center". Desson Howe, in his review for the Washington Post, wrote, "Soderbergh and screenwriter Stephen Gaghan, who based this on a British television miniseries of the same name, have created an often exhilarating, soup-to-nuts exposé of the world's most lucrative trade". In his review for Rolling Stone, Peter Travers wrote, "The hand-held camerawork – Soderbergh himself did the holding—provides a documentary feel that rivets attention". However, Richard Schickel of Time, in a rare negative review, finds the film's biggest weakness to be that it contains the "cliches of a hundred crime movies" before concluding that "Traffic, for all its earnestness, does not work. It leaves one feeling restless and dissatisfied". In an interview, director Ingmar Bergman lauded the film as "amazing".

Accolades

Top ten lists
Traffic appeared on several critics' top ten lists for 2000. Some of the notable top-ten list appearances are:
 2nd: A. O. Scott, The New York Times
 2nd: Jami Bernard, New York Daily News
 2nd: Bruce Kirkland, The Toronto Sun
 3rd: Stephen Holden, The New York Times
 3rd: Owen Gleiberman, Entertainment Weekly
 3rd: Peter Travers, Rolling Stone
 4th: Roger Ebert, Chicago Sun-Times
 4th: Jack Mathews, New York Daily News

See also

 Hyperlink cinema—the film style of using multiple interconnected story lines
 List of media set in San Diego
 Mexican Drug War
 Narco film

Notes

References

External links

 
 
 
 
 
 Traffic: Border Wars an essay by Manohla Dargis at the Criterion Collection

2000 films
2000s Spanish-language films
2000 crime drama films
American crime drama films
American crime thriller films
American political drama films
American political thriller films
BAFTA winners (films)
Edgar Award-winning works
Films about Mexican drug cartels
Films based on television series
Films featuring a Best Supporting Actor Academy Award-winning performance
Films featuring a Best Supporting Actor Golden Globe winning performance
Films set in Maryland
Films set in Mexico
Films set in Ohio
Films set in Cincinnati
Films set in San Diego
Films set in Texas
Films set in Tijuana
Films set in Washington, D.C.
Films shot in California
Films shot in El Paso, Texas
Films shot in Mexico
Films shot in New Mexico
Films whose director won the Best Directing Academy Award
Films whose editor won the Best Film Editing Academy Award
Films whose writer won the Best Adapted Screenplay Academy Award
Films whose writer won the Best Adapted Screenplay BAFTA Award
Films scored by Cliff Martinez
Films directed by Steven Soderbergh
Films with screenplays by Stephen Gaghan
Hyperlink films
Initial Entertainment Group films
USA Films films
Tijuana Cartel
2000s English-language films
2000s American films
2000s Mexican films
Films shot in Cincinnati
Films shot in San Diego